The Taipei Metro Beimen station is a station on the Songshan line located in Datong District, Taipei City, Taiwan.

Station overview
This four-level, underground station has two side platforms. It is located beneath Tacheng St. beneath Civic Blvd. and Zhongxiao West Rd. It was scheduled to open in December 2013 with the launch of the Songshan Line. However, the opening of Beimen station was delayed until 15 November 2014.

The southeastern part of the station connects to the Taipei City Mall, which connects through to Taipei Main Station.

Public Art
The theme for this station is "Bearing Grace and Inaugurating Vision". It uses silhouette carvings to represent historical images of Old Taipei, Beimen station, and the history of railway transportation. Artworks include "The Gate of Taipei City", "Bearing Grace" series, "Locomotives" in the "Inaugurating Vision" series, and historical photos of Taipei.

History

It was a terminus for the Tamsui Line. It was an at-grade station with side platforms. This station was closed on 6 March 1923. The Taipei Metro station opened on 15 November 2014.

Construction
It has four exits, one of which is integrated with the South Wing of the National Taiwan Museum.

Taipei Workshop, a Grade 3 historical monument constructed during the era of Japanese rule, was exactly where the future Beimen station would be located. Thus, a removal project commenced on 20 October 2006 to temporarily move the structure until construction of both the Songshan line and the Taoyuan Airport MRT are completed. The building was moved 30 meters to the southeast, and was moved back when construction was completed.

Station layout

Around the station
 Dadaocheng Wharf

References

2014 establishments in Taiwan
Railway stations opened in 2014
Songshan–Xindian line stations